The American Fork Third Ward Meetinghouse is a historic Gothic Revival building with Jacobethan Revival decorative elements located on West 300 North in American Fork, Utah.  Built from 1903 to 1905, it operated as a meetinghouse for members of the Church of Jesus Christ of Latter-day Saints until 1994.  It was expanded with the addition of wings in 1938 and in 1958.  The building was sold to the Briar Rose Preschool in 1994 and remodeled for use as a school.  In 1991, the building was sold to the Chapel Hill Academy.  The building was sold again in 2001 and renovated as the Northampton Reception Center.  The building was listed on the National Register of Historic Places in 2002.

See also
American Fork Second Ward Meetinghouse

References

Churches completed in 1903
Former Latter Day Saint religious buildings and structures
Gothic Revival church buildings in Utah
Meetinghouses of the Church of Jesus Christ of Latter-day Saints in Utah
Churches on the National Register of Historic Places in Utah
Religious buildings and structures in Utah County, Utah
Buildings and structures in American Fork, Utah
National Register of Historic Places in Utah County, Utah